The 26th National Film Awards, presented by Directorate of Film Festivals, the organisation set up by Ministry of Information and Broadcasting, India to felicitate the best of Indian Cinema released in the year 1978. Ceremony took place in April 1979.

Juries 

Two different committees were formed for feature films and short films, headed by Chetan Anand and Kironmoy Raha respectively.

 Jury Members: Feature Films
 Chetan Anand (Chairperson)Sanjukta PanigrahiArvind KumarManohar Shyam JoshiHameeduddin Mehmood
 Vinay Chandra MaudglayaBhisham SahniJamunaVimla PatilSatish AlekarS. L. BhyrappaNaa Parthasarthy
 Nirad N. MohapatraG. L. BhardwajBasu BhattacharyaK. K. Nair
 Jury Members: Short Films
 Kironmoy Raha (Chairperson)Aruna VasudevM. T. Vasudevan Nair

Awards 

Awards were divided into feature films and non-feature films.

Lifetime Achievement Award

Feature films 

Feature films were awarded at All India as well as regional level. For 26th National Film Awards, no film was awarded the President's Gold Medal for the All India Best Feature Film. It is the only year for National Film Awards not to give away this award till now. A Hindi film Gaman, a Bengali film Parashuram and a Malayalam film Thampu won the maximum number of awards (three). Following were the awards given in each category:

All India Award 

Following were the awards given:

Regional Award 

The awards were given to the best films made in the regional languages of India. For feature films in Bengali, English, Hindi, Kashmiri, Meitei and Punjabi, award for Best Feature Film was not given.

Non-Feature films 

Following were the awards given:

Short films

Awards not given 

Following were the awards not given as no film was found to be suitable for the award:

 Best Feature Film
 Second Best Feature Film
 Best Story
 Best Film on Family Welfare
 Best Lyrics
 Best Film on Social Documentation
 Best Experimental Film
 Best Animation Film
 President's Silver Medal for Best Feature Film in Assamese
 President's Silver Medal for Best Feature Film in English
 President's Silver Medal for Best Feature Film in Manipuri
 President's Silver Medal for Best Feature Film in Marathi
 President's Silver Medal for Best Feature Film in Oriya
 President's Silver Medal for Best Feature Film in Punjabi
 President's Silver Medal for Best Feature Film in Tamil

References

External links 
 National Film Awards Archives
 Official Page for Directorate of Film Festivals, India

National Film Awards (India) ceremonies
1979 Indian film awards